58 Armoured Regiment is a regiment in the Armoured Corps of the Indian Army. It was raised in Patiala on 1 October 2014 as an all-India all-caste regiment, i.e. its soldiers are recruited from all over India without any distinctions based on ethnicity, caste, region, etc. 

Lieutenant General Kamal Jit Singh, PVSM, AVSM* was appointed as the first Colonel of the regiment on 20 January 2015. 

The regiment participated in the Republic Day parade in 2017 with its T-90 tanks.

References

Armoured and cavalry regiments of the Indian Army from 1947